María Carmen Díaz de Mendoza Larrabeiti (born December 1927) is a Spanish theatre actress.

Life
Mari Carmen Díaz de Mendoza was born in Madrid towards the end of 1927.   Her parents,  and Carmen Larrabeiti, who were both actors, had married the previous year.   He paternal grand parents were also highly successful in the world of theatre.   Although Mari Carmen made one or two film appearances, the focus of her own acting career was the theatre.

She embarked on her stage career in the 1940s at the Theatre of María Guerrero, originally purchased by her grandfather, the theatrical impresario Fernando Díaz de Mendoza y Aguado, back in 1908. In 1944 she appeared in a play based on Dostoyevsky's "Demons", playing opposite . A few months later she transferred to the Teatro Español, in June 1945 appearing in "Hamlet" with Marin and Mercedes Prendes.

She was part of the production of En la ardiente oscuridad by Antonio Buero Vallejo, which had its triumphant premier in December 1950 at the Teatro María Guerrero.

Later in the decade Díaz de Mendoza switched to Madrid's Teatro de la Comedia where she shared the stage with Alberto Closas in "¿De acuerdo, Susana?" (1955) and appeared in "Mi adorado Juan" (1956) by Miguel Mihura, with Ismael Merlo, as well as featuring with Carlos Muñoz in "En cualquier Puerta del Sol" (1956) by Carlos Llopis and in "48 horas de felicidad" (1956) by Alfonso Paso.   In 1957 she was in La malquerida by Jacinto Benavente, a piece which had premiered 45 years earlier, with her grandmother heading up the cast.

In each of these she starred opposite Ángel Picazo. A year later, after playing in a theatrical version of La vida en un hilo by Edgar Neville, she retired from the stage.

She bore no children and died on 11 March 2018.

Personal
Mari Carmen Díaz de Mendoza was married in September 1959 to José Beltrán de Heredia, a professor of civil law initially at Salamanca and later in Madrid.   He died in 1992, however.

References

Spanish stage actresses
People from Madrid
1927 births
Spanish actresses
Living people